Michael Granger (1923–1981) was an American actor.

Michael Granger may also refer to:
 Mick Granger (1931–2016), English footballer
 Mike Granger (born 1991), American athlete